The Winston-Salem Dash are a Minor League Baseball team in Winston-Salem, North Carolina. They are a High-A team in the South Atlantic League and have been a farm team of the Chicago White Sox since 1997. The Dash began playing their home games at the Truist Stadium in 2010 after having Ernie Shore Field (now known as Gene Hooks Field at Wake Forest Baseball Park) as their home from 1956 to 2009.

History
Previous baseball clubs in Winston-Salem had typically been called the "Twins", in reference to the long-since-merged "Twin Cities" of Winston and Salem since 1905. The Twins played in the Virginia-North Carolina League in 1905, the Carolina Baseball Association from 1908 to 1917 and the Piedmont League from 1920 to 1933 and again from 1937 to 1942.

The current franchise joined the Carolina League in 1945, and is the oldest continuously operating team in that circuit.  Originally a St. Louis Cardinals affiliate, it retained the Twins name until 1953, when it became the Winston-Salem Cardinals. The 1950 team was recognized as one of the 100 greatest minor league teams of all time.

After a brief period (1957–60) as the Winston-Salem Red Birds, the team switched affiliation in 1961 to the Boston Red Sox. It remained with the Red Sox for 22 years, and was known until 1983 as the Winston-Salem Red Sox. In 1984, the team changed affiliates again, this time contracting with the Chicago Cubs, and changed its name to the Winston-Salem Spirits.

The team initially retained the Spirits name after becoming the Cincinnati Reds A-level affiliate in 1993, winning the Carolina League championship in that same year.  After the 1994 season, the club decided to change its name and sponsored a contest through the local newspaper, the Winston-Salem Journal, to come up with a new name. The winning entry, the Warthogs, became the official team name in 1995. In addition to being alliterative, it also referred to the somewhat-celebrated acquisition of some warthogs at the North Carolina Zoo around that time. As the Warthogs, they were the league champion in 2003.

On December 4, 2008, the team publicly announced that they would be called the Winston-Salem Dash from 2009 onward.  The Dash name is rumored to be a reference to a nickname for the city of Winston-Salem, "The Dash", a reference to the (-) symbol used in the middle of the city's name, despite the fact that it isn't a dash at all, but a hyphen.

As the Warthogs, the team's mascot was Wally Warthog. With the new nickname, the Dash held a name-the-mascot contest for Wally's replacement. In keeping with the image of speed implied by "The Dash", the new mascot is a lightning-themed character named Bolt.

In conjunction with Major League Baseball's restructuring of Minor League Baseball in 2021, the Dash were organized into the High-A East. In 2022, the High-A East became known as the South Atlantic League, the name historically used by the regional circuit prior to the 2021 reorganization.

Ballparks
The club originally played at South Side Park, south of the downtown area. When that park burned, a new park was built on the north side, near the Wake Forest University campus and the RJR plant, and named Ernie Shore Field in honor of the former major leaguer who had led the fund drive for the new ballpark. Opened in 1956, Ernie Shore Field seats 6,000 fans. BB&T Ballpark was hoped to be completed for the 2009 season, or sometime within the season, but construction came to a halt due to a lack of funding. Meanwhile, Ernie Shore Field had been sold to Wake Forest and renamed as Gene Hooks Field at Wake Forest Baseball Park, compelling the Dash to lease the ballpark back for the 2009 season. On June 2, 2009, the Dash announced a new scheduled opening for the 2010 season.

On February 24, 2010, the Dash announced BB&T Ballpark's official name.

The Dash finally opened the new BB&T Ballpark on April 13, 2010.

Year-by-year record
(Compiled from)

Roster

Notable alumni

Hall of Fame alumni
 Wade Boggs (1977) Inducted, 2005
 Earl Weaver (1950) Inducted, 1996

Notable alumni
 Don Aase (1974) MLB All-Star
 Jim Abbott (1998)
 Mike Andrews (1963) MLB All-Star
 Todd Benzinger (1982)
 Don Blasingame (1953) MLB All-Star
 Aaron Boone (1995) MLB All-Star
 Garland Braxton (1939–1940) 1927 AL ERA Leader
 Ken Brett (1967) MLB All-Star
 Rick Burleson (1971) 4 x MLB All-Star
 Cecil Cooper (1971) 5 x MLB All-Star
 Joe Crede (1998) MLB All-Star
 General Crowder (1923) MLB All-Star
 Joe Cunningham (1952) 2 x MLB All-Star
 John Curtis (1968)
 Harry Danning (1932) 4 x MLB All-Star
 Dixie Davis (1931)
 Bo Diaz (1975) 2 x MLB All-Star
 Dwight Evans (1971) 8 x Gold Glove; 3 x MLB All Star
 Hoot Evers (1941) 2 x MLB All-Star
 Jon Garland (1999) MLB All-Star
 Doug Glanville (1992)
 Gio Gonzalez (2005) 2 x MLB All-Star
 Ted Gray (1942) MLB All-Star
 Mike Greenwell (1984) 2 x MLB All-Star
 Harvey Haddix (1947) 3 x MLB All-Star
 Jim Hickman (1958) MLB All-Star
 Butch Hobson (1973)
 Bobby Jenks (2008) 2 x MLB All-Star
 Jim Lonborg (1964) MLB All-Star; 1967 AL Cy Young Award
 Jim King (1951)
 Johnny Klippstein (1946)
 Bill Lee (1968) MLB All-Star
 Carlos Lee (1997) 3 x MLB All-Star
 Hank Leiber (1932) 3 x MLB All-Star
 Sparky Lyle (1965) 3 x MLB All-Star; 1977 AL Cy Young Award
 Steve Lyons (1981)
 Brandon McCarthy (2004)
 Lynn McGlothen (1970) MLB All-Star
 Stu Miller (1951) 2 x MLB All-Star
 Eddie Moore (1939)
 Jamie Moyer (1985) MLB All-Star
 Van Mungo (1930) 4 x MLB All-Star
 Gene Oliver (1957)
 Rico Petrocelli (1962) 2 x MLB All-Star
 Rip Repulski (1949) MLB All-Star
 Aaron Rowand (1999) MLB All-Star
 Chris Sale (2010) 6 x MLB All-Star
 George Scott (1964) 3 x MLB All-star
 Mike Shannon (1959)
 Heathcliff Slocumb (1987) MLB All-Star
 Al Smith (1932) MLB All-Star
 Lee Thomas (1956) 2 x MLB All-Star
 Steve Trachsel (1991) MLB All-Star
 John Tudor (1976)
 Dick Wakefield (1941) MLB All-Star
 Vic Wertz (1942) 4 x MLB All-Star
 Ernie Whitt (1973) MLB All-Star
 Wilbur Wood (1961) 3 x MLB All-Star

References

External links

 Official website

Baseball teams established in 1945
Professional baseball teams in North Carolina
Sports in Winston-Salem, North Carolina
Chicago White Sox minor league affiliates
St. Louis Cardinals minor league affiliates
Carolina League teams
New York Giants minor league affiliates
Brooklyn Dodgers minor league affiliates
Cleveland Guardians minor league affiliates
New York Yankees minor league affiliates
Boston Red Sox minor league affiliates
Chicago Cubs minor league affiliates
Cincinnati Reds minor league affiliates
1945 establishments in North Carolina
High-A East teams
South Atlantic League teams